Air Chief Marshal Sir Denis Hensley Fulton Barnett,  (11 February 1906 – 31 December 1992) was a squadron commander and senior officer in the Royal Air Force during the Second World War. In the post war years he held high command, serving as the British air commander during the Suez War and subsequently the Air Officer Commanding-in-Chief Transport Command and the Commander of British Forces Cyprus.

Barnett was born in Dunedin, New Zealand, his parents being Sir Louis Barnett and Mabel Violet Barnett née Fulton (daughter of Catherine Fulton and James Fulton).  He had three elder brothers, including Miles Barnett, and an older sister.   He married Pamela Grant (21 December 1918 - 30 August 2010) on 22 April 1939, and they went on to have three daughters and one son.

RAF career
The New Zealander Barnett was commissioned into the Royal Air Force in 1929. He was appointed Officer Commanding No. 84 Squadron in 1938 and then served in the Second World War taking charge of No. 40 Squadron in June 1940. He joined the Air Staff at Headquarters Bomber Command in 1941 and then became Station Commander at RAF Swanton Morley in 1942. He returned to Bomber Command in June 1943 taking on the roles of Deputy Director of Operations, then Senior Air Staff Officer and finally Director of Operations.

After the war he joined the Air Staff in India and then became Commandant of the Central Bomber Establishment in 1949 before becoming Director of Operations at the Air Ministry in 1950. He became UK Representative at the United Nations Command Headquarters in Tokyo in 1952, Air Officer Commanding No. 205 Group in 1954 and Commandant of the RAF Staff College, Bracknell, in 1956. With the Suez Crisis unfolding in Autumn 1956, he became Commander of the Allied Air Task Force for Operation Musketeer and ordered to carry out the bombing Egyptian airfields in order to achieve air superiority.

He returned to the UK as Air Secretary in 1957. His final appointments were as Air Officer Commanding-in-Chief Transport Command in 1959 and Air Officer Commanding-in-Chief RAF Near East Air Force (including responsibility for British Forces Cyprus and Administration of the Sovereign Base Areas) in 1962 before retiring in 1964.

In retirement he became Board Member for Weapons Research & Development at the Atomic Energy Authority.

References

|-
 

|-

|-

1906 births
1992 deaths
Royal Air Force air marshals
British military personnel of the Suez Crisis
Commanders of the Legion of Merit
Commandeurs of the Légion d'honneur
New Zealand recipients of the Légion d'honneur
Recipients of the Croix de Guerre (France)